The Union of Serbs of Romania (SSR; , USR) is a political party representing the Serbian minority in Romania. It was founded in 1989 by a Romanian-Serbian writer, Slavomir Gvozdenovici. The party used to be known as Democratic Union of Serbs in Romania. It currently has one reserved seat in the Romanian Chamber of Deputies.

Members of Chamber of Deputies

1990–1992: Milenco Luchin  / Milenko Lukin
1992–2008: Slavomir Gvozdenovici / Slavomir Gvozdenović
2008–2012: Dușan Popov / Dušan Popov
2012–2016: Slavomir Gvozdenovici / Slavomir Gvozdenović
Since 2016: Slavoliub Adnagi / Slavoljub Adnađi

Electoral history

See also
Romanian ethnic minorities parties

External links
Romanian Chamber of Deputies

Political parties established in 1989
Political parties of minorities in Romania
Non-registered political parties in Romania
Serbs of Romania
1989 establishments in Romania